Robert Edmund Carew (1 December 1898 – 5 September 1969) was an Australian rules footballer who played in the VFL between 1919 and 1922 for the Richmond Football Club.

Notes

References
Hogan P: The Tigers Of Old, Richmond FC, Melbourne 1996

External links

1898 births
1969 deaths
Australian rules footballers from Melbourne
Australian Rules footballers: place kick exponents
Players of Australian handball
Richmond Football Club players
Richmond Football Club Premiership players
Two-time VFL/AFL Premiership players
People from Williamstown, Victoria